Sowmya is a given name for females. It means "That which is born of Soma". Soma means Chandra, the lunar deity. Sowmya therefore means Budha, because Budha is said to be the son of Chandra. Sowmya also means shubhagrahas or beneficial. Sowmya also means soft and pure. Sowmya also means "silence" sowmyas features husband name starts with letter 'A'Sowmya also means calm and pleasant.

People named Sowmya
S. Sowmya - South Indian Classical singer
Sowmya Raoh- Playback singer
Sowmya Rachakonda - Carnatic music singer and Analytics professional
Sowmya Reddy— Member of Karnataka Legislative Assembly representing Jayanagar, Bangalore